The  is a railway line in Japan operated by the East Japan Railway Company (JR East) adjacent to the Pacific Ocean, on the eastern (i.e., outer) side of the Bōsō Peninsula. It connects Chiba Station in Chiba to Awa-Kamogawa Station in Kamogawa, passing through Ōamishirasato, Mobara, Chōsei, Ichinomiya, Isumi, Onjuku, and Katsuura. The line is connected to the Uchibō Line at both ends. South of Kazusa-Ichinomiya is single track, and north of Kazusa-Ichinomiya is double track.

Services
In addition to local services, limited express and Rapid ("Commuter Rapid") services run on this line.
Limited Express Wakashio
 – (Keiyō Line) –  – 
Rapid / Commuter Rapid
 – (Yokosuka Line) – Tokyo – (Sōbu Line (Rapid)) – Soga – 

Station list

 Legend

 ● : All trains stop
 (●) : Some trains stop
 | : All trains pass

 Notes

 Local trains stop at every station.

Rolling stock
Local service
 E131 series 2-car EMUs (since 13 March 2021)
 209-2000/2100 series 4/6-car EMUs

Keiyō Line through service

Between  and :
 209-500 series 10-car EMUs
 E233-5000 series 6+4-car and 10-car EMUs

Sōbu Line (Rapid) through service

Between  and :
 E217 series 11+4-car EMUs
 E235-1000 series 11+4-car EMUs (since 21 December  2020)

 Wakashio Limited Express
 255 series EMUs 
 E257-500 series EMUs

Former rolling stock
 113 series EMUs (Sotobō Line local services, until 2011)
 211-3000 series 5-car EMUs (Sotobō Line local services from 21 October 2006 to spring 2013)

History

The Boso Railway opened the Chiba to Oami section in 1896, extending the line to Kazusa-Ichinomiya the following year and to Ohara in 1899. The company was nationalised in 1907. The extension to Katsuura opened in 1913, to Kazusa-Okitsu in 1927, and Awa-Kamogawa in 1929.

A new tunnel and associated deviation was opened at Toke in 1954 to improve the loading gauge of the line. The Chiba to Soga section was double-tracked between 1960 and 1963, extended to Nagata between 1972 and 1974, with CTC signalling being commissioned between Soga and Awa-Kamogawa in 1974. The line to Kazusa-Ichinomiya was double-tracked between 1980 and 1986, with the Onjuku to Katsuura section double-tracked in 1995, and the Torami to Chojamachi section the following year. The entire line was electrified in 1968, and freight services ceased between 1982 and 1987.

Former connecting lines
The council then decided to build a railway to connect to the Kominato Line.  of  gauge line was opened as far as Okuno between 1930 and 1933, the first  following the handcar line alignment. Poor patronage and economic circumstances led to the line being closed in 1939.
A railcar was converted to petrol engine power in 1922. The line closed in 1927 to allow for the construction of the Isumi Line, which opened on the same alignment in 1930.

Accidents
On 8 May 2020, at 3:55 pm, the front carriage of a local service derailed between Awa-Kamogawa and Awa-Amatsu stations. Around 20 passengers and crew were on board the train (a 209 Series) when it derailed. One person was taken to a hospital.

References

External links

 JR East Sōbu and Bōsō area route map

 
Lines of East Japan Railway Company
Railway lines in Chiba Prefecture
1067 mm gauge railways in Japan
Railway lines opened in 1896